NIDA is a political party in the Netherlands, describing itself as "being inspired by Islam". It was founded in 2013 by Nourdin El Ouali, a former municipal councillor in Rotterdam for GroenLinks. The party is currently only represented at the municipal level, with two seats in Rotterdam and one seat in The Hague. The party shares the same electorate as Denk, mostly Islamic immigrants, although NIDA is more religiously oriented.

History

2014 municipal elections 
The party first participated solely in Rotterdam, where it received 2 seats in the municipal council with 4.8% of the vote. It did not have a political programme, instead promoting their plans by means of a 'political pamphlet'.

2018 municipal elections 
The party kept its 2 seats in Rotterdam, increasing its vote share to 5.4%. The party also expanded to The Hague, getting one seat with a vote share of 2.3%. The party initially participated in the "Leftist Covenant" with the PvdA, SP and GroenLinks, releasing a joint manifesto supporting a 'social, ecological and inclusive Rotterdam' and against Livable Rotterdam. However, the coalition collapsed over a tweet from 2014 where party leader Nourdin El Ouali compared Israel to Daesh.

2019 Provincial States elections 
The party's first attempt to participate in national politics came in 2019, where it participated in provincial elections in North Holland and South Holland. The party did not receive any seat in the Provincial States, receiving 0.4% and 0.5% respectively.

2021 general election 
In 2021, the party will participate in their first general election. Nourdin El Ouali has been appointed as lijsttrekker. The party only received 0.3% of vote share.

Protests and actions 
The party received national attention in June 2014, when party members organised a solidarity march for Gazans with a reported turnout of over ten thousand people. In November 2015, the party organised a similarly large march named 'Unity in Diversity Against Terrorism', with notable guests including the mayor of Rotterdam.

As a reaction to a partial ban of face-coverings such as the burqa, resulting in people wearing less restrictive head coverings such as hijabs being fined as well, the party started a 'hijab fund' to pay incorrectly applied fines.

References

2013 establishments in the Netherlands
Political parties established in 2013
Identity politics
Islam in the Netherlands
Islamic political parties
Islamic democratic political parties
Organisations based in Rotterdam
Multiculturalism in Europe
Political parties in the Netherlands
Anti-Zionism in the Netherlands